Benzamycin is a topical gel containing of 5% benzoyl peroxide and 3% erythromycin. Its main usage is to fight acne. Benzamycin is a prescription medication.

Side effects include dry skin, stinging, redness, and itchy rash (urticaria), with recommended usage is 2 times per day, once in the morning and once in the evening, or as prescribed by a doctor. The affected area should be washed with soap and warm water, rinsed, and gently dried before applying the gel. Using an oil-free face moisturizer in conjunction with Benzamycin is recommended.

On March 30, 2004, a generic form of Benzamycin was released by pharmaceutical company Atrix Laboratories.

References

External links
 "Atrix Laboratories, Inc. (ATRX) Receives FDA Approval For Erythromycin/Benzoyl Peroxide", Biospace.com, 10/19/2005

Anti-acne preparations
Combination drugs